Augustus Barry (1840 – August 3, 1871) was an Irish soldier who received the Medal of Honor for valor during the American Civil War.

Biography
Barry served in the American Civil War in the 16th U.S. Infantry for the Union Army. He received the Medal of Honor on February 28, 1870, for his actions in Tennessee and Georgia during the war.

Medal of Honor citation
Citation:

Gallantry in various actions during the rebellion.

See also

List of American Civil War Medal of Honor recipients: A–F

References

External links

Military Times

1840 births
1871 deaths
Union Army soldiers
United States Army Medal of Honor recipients
American Civil War recipients of the Medal of Honor
Irish emigrants to the United States (before 1923)